Hopley Yeaton (1739 – May 14, 1812) was the first officer commissioned (March 21, 1791) under the Constitution of the United States by George Washington into the Revenue Marine (later known as the Revenue Cutter Service), one of the forerunners of the modern-day United States Coast Guard. The Coast Guard was created when Congress merged the Revenue Cutter Service with the U.S. Lifesaving Service in 1915.

Born in Somersworth, New Hampshire, Yeaton was a veteran of the Continental Navy and the commanding officer of the Revenue Marine cutter Scammel. Yeaton probably brought along his slave, Senegal, during Scammel's patrols, as was this practice was permitted by the Treasury Department at this time. Yeaton fired three of his crew after their first few months of service. The men had been in "open rebellion" over issues of pay and daily food rations—particularly after they learned that their fellow sailors aboard USRC Massachusetts received more and varied foods each day than they did.

Yeaton resigned his commission on September 11, 1809. He suffered from poor health and retired to a farm at Eastport, Maine.

Monuments

Captain Hopley Yeaton Memorial
The tomb of Hopley Yeaton lies on the grounds of the U.S. Coast Guard Academy in New London, Connecticut. He was originally buried in Lubec, Maine, but in 1975 his burial site was threatened by modernization. The Corps of Cadets sailed the barque Eagle to Lubec, where his remains were exhumed and laid to rest at the Academy.

Hopley Yeaton Walk of History Plaque
On August 2, 2008, in a bid to help affirm Grand Haven, Michigan, as "Coast Guard City USA", the Walk of History was revealed to the public at Coast Guard Station Grand Haven. The first point of history on the walk was the Hopley Yeaton Plaque, which was ceremonially unveiled by Vice Adm. Clifford Pearson and  Andrew Yeaton, a direct descendant of Hopley Yeaton.

Citations

References
  No ISBN 
  No ISBN
 
   
 Hopley Yeaton Genealogy
 Coast Guard Monuments & Memorials
 Captain Hopley Yeaton Memorial 
 History of the Scammel
 Festival honors heritage in Walk of History
 Yeaton biographical note

1739 births
1812 deaths
Continental Navy officers
United States Revenue Cutter Service officers
People of colonial New Hampshire
People from New Hampshire
People from Lubec, Maine